This is a list of American television-related events in 1966.

Events

Other events in 1966 
The early 1950s CBS sitcom Amos 'n' Andy is pulled from off-network syndication in response to complaints from civil rights organizations, including the NAACP.

Television programs

Debuts

Ending this year

Television movies, specials and miniseries

Networks and services

Network launches

Television stations

Sign-ons

Network affiliation changes

Births

Deaths

References

External links 
List of 1966 American television series at IMDb